Arada may refer to:

Geography
 Arada, Chad, a town and subprefecture in the department of Biltine in eastern Chad
 Arada (Addis Ababa), one of the 10 subcities of Addis Ababa, the capital of Ethiopia
 Arada, Honduras, a municipality in the Honduran department of Santa Bárbara
 Arada, a tributary of the Albac in Alba County, Romania
 Bou Arada, a town and commune in the Siliana Governorate, Tunisia
 Horea (formerly Arada), a commune located in Alba County, Romania
 Arada, another spelling of Kingdom of Ardra, in modern Benin

Other uses
 "L'arada", a cycle of six folk songs by Canteloube 1935
 "Arada", a guitar instrumental written by Federico Moreno Torroba, the 2nd part of his Suite castellana (1926)
 Arada (company), a property developer based in Sharjah, United Arab Emirates
 Sultan Ali al-Arada (born 1959), Yemeni politician